A contrast agent (or contrast medium) is a substance used to increase the contrast of structures or fluids within the body in medical imaging. Contrast agents absorb or alter external electromagnetism or ultrasound, which is different from radiopharmaceuticals, which emit radiation themselves. In x-ray imaging, contrast agents enhance the radiodensity in a target tissue or structure. In magnetic resonance imaging, contrast agents shorten (or in some instances increase) the relaxation times of nuclei within body tissues in order to alter the contrast in the image.

Contrast agents are commonly used to improve the visibility of blood vessels and the gastrointestinal tract.

The types of contrast agent are classified according their intended imaging modalities.

Radiocontrast media

For radiography, which is based on X-rays, iodine and barium are the most common types of contrast agent. Various sorts of iodinated contrast agents exist, with variations occurring between the osmolarity, viscosity and absolute iodine content. Non-ionic dimers are favored for their low osmolarity and toxicity, but have a correspondingly higher price attached to their use.

MRI contrast agents

Gadolinium is used in magnetic resonance imaging as an MRI contrast agent. In the 3+ oxidation state the metal has seven unpaired electrons. This causes water around the contrast agent to relax quickly, enhancing the quality of the MRI scan.

Ultrasound contrast agents

Microbubbles are used as contrast agents for sonographic examination, specifically echocardiograms, for the detection of a cardiac shunt. These microbubbles are composed of agitated saline solution, most of which are too large to pass through the lung capillaries. Therefore, the only ones that reach the left side of the heart pass through an abnormal connection between the two sides of the heart, known as a right-to-left shunt. In addition, pharmaceutically prepared microbubbles are composed of tiny amounts of nitrogen or perfluorocarbons strengthened and supported by a protein, lipid, or polymer shell. These are small enough to pass through the capillaries and are used to increase the contrast in the left ventricle, improving the visualization of its walls. The drop in density on the interface between the gas in the bubble and the surrounding liquid strongly scatters and reflects the ultrasound back to the probe. This process of backscattering gives the liquid with these bubbles a high signal, which can be seen in the resulting image.

See also
Iodinated contrast
Ipodate sodium
Medical imaging
Radiology
Barium meal

References